Leptocroca lenita is a moth of the family Oecophoridae. It was described by Philpott in 1930. It is found in New Zealand.

References

Moths described in 1929
Oecophoridae